The 1500 metres distance for men in the 2010–11 ISU Speed Skating World Cup was contested over six races on six occasions, out of a total of eight World Cup occasions for the season, with the first occasion taking place in Heerenveen, Netherlands, on 12–14 November 2010, and the final occasion also taking place in Heerenveen on 4–6 March 2011.

Shani Davis of the United States successfully defended his title, while Håvard Bøkko of Norway repeated his second place from the previous season, and Stefan Groothuis of the Netherlands came third.

Top three

Race medallists

Standings
Standings as of 6 March 2011 (end of the season).

References

Men 1500